British Entomology is a classic work of entomology by John Curtis, FLS. It is subtitled Being Illustrations and Descriptions of the Genera of Insects found in Great Britain and Ireland: Containing Coloured Figures from Nature of the Most Rare and Beautiful Species, and in Many Instances of the Plants Upon Which they are Found.
 

The work comprises 770 hand-coloured, copper-plate engravings, each 8 by  inches (20×14 cm), together with two or more pages of text. The work was issued in monthly parts over 16 years, each part comprising three or more (usually four) plates.  Plates were initially printed on James Whatman's Turkey Mill paper and then (circa 1832) on Rye Mill paper.

It was a masterpiece of the engraver's and colourist's art, described by the eminent French naturalist Georges Cuvier as the "paragon of perfection". Close examination of a proof set of plates (see below) reveals an obsessive attention to detail. The shading of the foliage is typically achieved by multiple, finely engraved lines spaced at intervals of five or more to the millimetre. The fronds (olfactory receptors) of many moth antennae are individually coloured – as in plate 674 (left). Several beetles and flies have body and limb highlights picked out in minute dots and lines of powdered gold. Thoracic and abdominal hairs are mostly painted individually. Where transparent wings are shown extended the colouring involved the precise application of multiple colour washes overlaid by a satin finish, gum arabic glaze to reproduce the visual effect of iridescence.

Almost every plate includes an equally well rendered botanical element, often the dominant part of the illustration.  In a footnote to the first plate, Curtis explains this as follows:

Every illustration and line drawing was engraved or finished by Curtis himself, all the plates in volumes I, II, XV and XVI were engraved entirely by his hand. He also personally coloured the four proof sets and very closely supervised the hand colouring of all other plates. The final issue of the first edition (December 1839) included comprehensive indexes to all volumes plus a newly written eight-page preface summarising the production, costs and efforts involved. Also published at that time was a complete list of subscribers for each volume and detailed instructions for binding the work into eight volumes to generate the correct sequence of orders. Many copies were, however, bound in the alternative manner as sixteen volumes with the plates in numerical order. Curtis's original 778 drawings (some drawings were combined to produce a single plate, e.g. plate 703) were purchased by Lord Rothschild whose heirs, after having unsuccessfully tried to sell them in 1910, donated them to the Natural History Museum, London.

The work was unsystematically produced but each plate is dated, so this generally introduces no problems of name priority. However, confusion can arise with reprinted plates 1 to 34 (see below) where the text was rewritten, often with changes to nomenclature, yet the dates shown on the plates remained unchanged.

Aside from its noted illustrations, British Entomology is a work of taxonomy introducing many new species. This is especially true of the folios on Diptera and Hymenoptera. In his preface to the work, published in December 1839, Curtis writes: "... the articles and descriptions are my own writing; for any errors therefore I alone am accountable". However, it is clear from the dedications to the individual volumes that he had help from the likes of Alexander Henry Haliday, James Charles Dale, William Kirby and others.

If systematically bound as intended and instructed by Curtis, the resulting eight-volume set will be as follows:
Volume 1 – Coleoptera (Part 1) dedicated to William Kirby and Alexander Macleay
Volume 2 – Coleoptera (Part2) dedicated to William Jackson Hooker and John Stevens Henslow
Volume 3 – Dermaptera, Dictyoptera, Orthoptera, Strepsiptera, Hymenoptera (Part 1) dedicated to John Lindley and Charles Lyell
Volume 4 – Hymenoptera (Part 2) dedicated to Pierre André Latreille and William Sharp Macleay
Volume 5 – Lepidoptera (Part 1) dedicated to James Charles Dale and Charles Daubeny
Volume 6 – Lepidoptera (Part 2) dedicated to Charles A. Harris and William Spence
Volume 7 – Homoptera, Hemiptera, Aphaniptera dedicated to Alexander Henry Haliday, Henry Walker and Francis Walker
Volume 8 – Diptera, Omaloptera, dedicated to Henry Brown, Henry Nesbitt and the Earl of Malmesbury

Due to its relative slimness, Curtis recommended that the indexes be placed at the end of Volume VII. However, most systematic bindings have the general indexes more conventionally placed at the end of Volume VIII.

Publication history 

First edition

Announcement in the Somerset House Gazette, Volume I, January 1824:

The initial subscribers' list comprised 167 names, of whom 87 were committing to take the entire work even though the total size and final publication date were then unknown. Publication commenced as announced with a proposed print run of 200 copies of each part to be issued monthly over 16 years as annual volumes each of 12 parts – 192 parts in all. Each monthly part to comprise three or more, usually four, plates with accompanying text. By January 1839 the list of subscribers had fallen to 142. Of the original subscribers, only 31 eventually purchased all 192 first-edition parts on the day of issue and of these, three were joint-subscribers for a single set and two others each purchased two sets. Curtis's set is known to have included the later reprints of parts 1 to 8. The final subscribers' list of January 1840 shows that two complete sets were sold in December 1839 to previously unrecorded subscribers, "G. Folliott Esq., Chester (proofs)" and "Mrs Butler, Vicar's Cross". Curiously, at the time the only occupied dwelling at Vicar's Cross was the mansion owned and occupied by George Folliott and his immediate family and servants, none of whom was named Butler. The Butler set almost certainly included all the reprints.

A complete, sixteen-volume, chronologically bound set was sold from Curtis's estate on 8 June 1863 (John C. Stevens, auctioneer, King Street, Covent Garden, London – Lot 54) but it is not known whether or not this exclusively comprised first-edition parts – it could be the harlequin set now with the British Entomological Society. The same sale also included an incomplete set of five volumes (Lot 55), a quantity of faulty prints (Lot 93) and a large quantity of good, loose coloured plates (Lot 95).

At most, including proofs, just 32 complete first-edition sets, free of reprints, are definitely known to have been issued.
Proof impressions
 

In spite of the finely detailed illustrations being more suited to steel-plate engraving, copper was used throughout. Curtis gives no clue as to why he made this choice. Copper plates noticeably degrade after as few as 50 impressions and so the earlier impressions, especially the proof sets, are of significantly higher quality and more finely detailed than those that followed.

Four complete sets of proof impressions, personally coloured by Curtis, were produced. These were sold at a considerable premium; one to Michael Bland of Paddington, London, and one to George Folliott of Vicar's Cross, Cheshire. The remaining two being taken by James Wadmore of Chapel Street, London.

A proof set can most easily be identified by reference to plate 717 (sycamore scale-insect - Coccus aceris), the first plate in Volume VII of a systematically bound set. The two setae of this insect are each delineated by two clearly separated, very fine lines; the left most of which is so fine as to be barely visible. Curtis significantly emboldened these lines for the standard impressions.

Reprint of Parts 1 to 8 (plates 1–34) and Parts 9 to 30

Demand from later, new subscribers required Curtis retrospectively to print at least an additional 72 sets of parts 1 to 30. This reprinting commenced in January 1829 and continued until 1840 and was concurrent with the printing of the remaining parts 31 to 192 of the first edition which were increased in number to accommodate the additional demand.

Reprints of the plates and text of parts 1 to 8 (plates 1 to 34) can all be identified by an underscore to the plate number and in the case of plate 30, also by the addition of the systematic reference number 283. The text was comprehensively rewritten and reset with changes to nomenclature that later caused taxonomists some confusion since the dates on the accompanying plates were left unchanged. Parts 9 to 30 were reset and reprinted without material alteration except for an underscore to some of the plate numbers. The reprinted plates and many of the plates from parts 31 to 192 show evidence of the finer details having been reworked and are noticeably coarsened as a result.

Total production

In January 1840 Curtis stated in the heading of the final List of Subscribers that; "It is impossible to complete the sets belonging to the Parties ... having only taken a few of the early volumes" indicating that he had ceased production of plates and parts and sold out of essential back copies. This list shows a final total output of 216 completed sets including proofs and reprints. Curtis's personal copy brings the total to 217. The list also shows that 54 partial sets were issued. To these figures should be added an unknown quantity of individual parts and plates sold separately. Therefore, total production was in excess of 210,000 plates, most of which were coloured. A monumental undertaking requiring an output of 44 fully finished plates and associated text every working day for 16 years.

Original costs and prices

As a footnote to the preface issued with the final part in December 1839, John Curtis wrote: "To enable those who are ignorant of the nature of such undertakings, to form some conception of their risk and magnitude, it may be here stated, that the colouring alone of the Plates has already cost upwards of £3000", equivalent to £350,000 today (2017, Bank of England Sterling Index). Those subscribing for all 192 coloured parts were committing to a total purchase price of £43.4s.0d., approximately the average annual income for a family living in London with husband, wife and one child working.

Lovell Reeves Edition

In 1862, Lovell Reeves published a partial reprint of the text and plates, the full details of which are now unknown except that all the plates were hand-coloured, lithographic copies easily identifiable today by their inferior quality with the dissection line drawings enlarged and randomly relocated. Plates and text from this reprint can sometime be found making up what would otherwise be an incomplete original set (see below). This edition was promoted in North America where Curtis had made no attempt to sell the original work.

Contemporary reviews 

From: The Entomological Magazine, Volume I, 1832.  Page 29.
 

The criticism outlined in the penultimate paragraph was entirely unjustified as Curtis was well aware of the danger and modified Jacob Hübner's slightly exaggerated and somewhat crudely rendered original drawings so as to portray the true characteristics of the British subspecies. At no time since has any entomologist supported the criticism or made comment as to the inaccuracy of the colouring or size of the larval depictions.

From: The Gentleman's Magazine, 1826. Page 153.

Surviving copies 

Report by C. Davies Sherborn and J. Hartley Durrant. 1 March 1911.

Note: The drawings were shortly thereafter withdrawn from sale and given to the British Museum.

As of January 2018, of the known, surviving bound sets, that held by the Natural History Museum, London (subscribed for by the Earl of Sheffield) originally comprised second edition versions of parts 1 - 30 but was corrected some time prior to 1911 by the separate acquisition of a first edition of Volume I. The set belonging to the Linnaen Society is all good except that it contains a number of uncoloured illustrations. The copy held by The British Library is, according to their catalogue of 1884, a complete 8 volume set reissued in London in 1862. Another at The Smithsonian is made up from three part sets, lacks 117 plates with 3 plates uncoloured but is in reasonable overall condition. A complete set of first edition plates and text, systematically arranged and bound in contemporary half calf covers was originally owned by the Physical Society of Guy's Hospital, then Kings College Hospital and is now held within the Wellcome Collection. It is in generally good condition but suffers strong paper toning and appears mainly to comprise end-of-run impressions as they are all comparatively coarse and lack much of the finest detail. Curtis's own set, now with the Royal Entomological Society, includes all the reprints.  A reportedly complete set, chronologically bound in 16 volumes, is held by Melbourne Museum. It was acquired by the museum in July, 1857 (via MacMillan of London), but its condition and make-up have not yet been investigated. Another set is held by the National Library of Ireland, another is to be found in the London library of the Royal Horticultural Society and a third by the Ulster Museum once belonged to George Crawford Hyndman. Two copies are catalogued by University of California, Berkeley libraries; one of which is incomplete, mis-bound, with reprints and at least one duplication (plate 638). Their second copy has not been located.

Two allegedly complete first-edition sets were recently sold at auction in Hamburg, Germany. Firstly, in May 2015, a set in good condition within modest, slightly damaged half-leather bindings formerly owned by John Waterhouse of Halifax, astronomer (not a subscriber) and secondly, on 20 November 2017, a reasonable set but with worn half-leather covers, provenance not disclosed. The whereabouts of these two are currently unknown. It is possible that they are both the same set, having suffered somewhat in the intervening thirty months.

Two complete, systematically arranged first-edition proof sets are in a private library in West Sussex, England. The first is one of the two sets subscribed for by James Wadmore of Paddington. It bears later ownership stamps; "T.H.T. Hopkins Magd: Coll: Oxford" for Thomas Henry Toovey Hopkins (1831–1885) at the College of St. Mary Magdalen, Oxford, England. This set, bound in green half morocco and buckram bindings, is in excellent condition .  The second, formerly at the Edge Hall Library, Malpas, Cheshire, England was originally purchased, as a complete presentation set, directly from Curtis in December 1839, by George Folliott (1801-1851) of Vicar's Cross House, Chester. On Folliott's death in 1851 it passed to his close friends, the Dod family (specifically; Frances Rosamond Dod) at nearby Edge Hall and thence by descent to Mr. A.K. Wolley Dod whose Residuary Trust disposed of the more important works in the Edge Hall Library via auction in 2017 whence it was acquired by the present owner. Its pristine, original condition makes it the finest known survivor, bound by White of Pall Mall in green, full morocco leather with triple-edge page gilding, outer and inner gilt dentelles.

The other two proof sets, if they have survived, remain to be discovered. A hint as to the possible history of one of them is to be found on page 4 of The Standard (London Edition) dated Wednesday 13 June 1900 where a report headed The Peel Library Sale reads, "Messrs Robinson and Fisher, at Willis's Rooms yesterday, held the first of a four days' sale of the library forming part of the Peel heirlooms.", recording a featured lot, " a[sic] Presentation copy from the author of John Curtis' British Entomology, with 700 coloured plates, £14". If this was indeed a proof, being a presentation copy explains its absence from the Subscribers' Lists. Other reported lots in the sale are mainly political in nature hinting that the presentation may have been to Prime Minister, Sir Robert Peel during his second term of office.

All other known, surviving complete sets appear to include reprints and lithographed substitutes making up the shortfalls. Those listed as being in American universities usually comprise the 1862 lithographic reprints, either that or their catalogues are referring to one of the harlequin copies held either by the U.C. Berkeley or the Ernst Mayer Library or the on-line copies freely accessible via the Biodiversity Heritage Library. In March 1911, after a lengthy search, C. Davies Sherborn and J. Hartley Durrant of The Entomological Society of London could locate only one properly complete set free of reprints and lithographed replacements, namely that held by the Linnaen Society library (see above).  In 1947 Richard E. Blackwelder investigated the five sets then known to be held in the United States, the results of his enquiries were published by The Smithsonian as the Smithsonian Miscellaneous Collections, Volume 107, Number 5, entitled "The Dates and Editions of Curtis' British Entomology". All five sets examined by Blackwelder were found to be made-up, including several lithographed copy plates.

As of 1 December 2019, eleven, complete, original, first edition copies, two with partially coloured plates, have been located and positively identified. Beyond these there are twenty other known examples, either incomplete or made up from later editions and reprints. The finest, most accurately illustrated and precisely coloured entomological (and botanical) publication ever produced is now also one of the rarest.

External links

 Video showing a selection of proof plates with extreme close-ups illustrating the extraordinarily fine details
 Detailed taxonomic descriptions of British insects, accompanied by quality scans of all the Curtis plates with updated names for all the insects and plants illustrated by him
 British Entomology at Google Books
 BHL Scans of 653 (of 770) plates and text. Medium quality. Downloads.
 YouTube Video with close-ups of 40 plates from the Wadmore-Hopkins set. High quality.

Entomological literature